Sondre Lerche (born 5 September 1982) is a Norwegian singer, songwriter and musician. He has released nine studio albums.

Early life
Growing up in a suburb of Bergen, Lerche was heavily influenced by 1980s pop. Lerche was fascinated by bands such as the Beatles, A-ha, the Beach Boys, and Prefab Sprout, and began formal guitar instruction at the age of eight. Not being satisfied with classical lessons, Lerche's teacher introduced him to Brazilian music, such as bossa nova, and thus formed the foundation of Lerche's vast array of complex melodies and chords throughout his music today. At the age of fourteen, Lerche penned his first song, "Locust Girl." Lerche performed acoustic gigs at the club where his sister worked while he was still under age. Norwegian producer H.P. Gundersen "discovered" Lerche, and began to mentor him, exposing him to diverse music genres, including psychedelia, 1960s pop, and mainstream Brazilian music.

Career
Lerche met with Oslo-based manager Tatiana Penzo, leading up to a deal with Virgin Norway signed in 2000. His popularity in his home country increased steadily, and, in 2000, he recorded his debut album, Faces Down.

Faces Down was not released until 2001, after Lerche finished schooling. In the interim, he was named Best New Act at the Norwegian Grammys (Spellemannprisen) and performed locally in support of major acts such as Beth Orton. Faces Down was officially released in Norway in September 2001 and gradually throughout all of Europe. Lerche toured with various acts, including his long-time idols, a-ha, in Oslo. Autumn 2002 saw the release of Faces Down in America and Lerche's first major tour of the United States. Faces Down was a hit in Norway and received critical praise in Norway and the United States — Rolling Stone Magazine placed it in their top 50 albums of 2002. He released the live/studio collection Don't Be Shallow EP the following year. In 2003, he toured with another one of his musical heroes, Elvis Costello (they toured together once again in 2005).

In 2004, his second album was released, Two Way Monologue, also produced by Gundersen. The album displayed more of Lerche's ability to span many different styles—from pop-like and upbeat tracks to more mellow or melodic tunes. It was very well received, with positive reviews in Rolling Stone and Pitchfork. Devon Powers of Popmatters praised Sondre's "contagious musical sensibilities, exhilarating vigor and downright stupefying songcraft," and noted that "Lerche manages to both push himself and maintain an allegiance to his ways – something artists twice his age have trouble doing."

On 27 February 2006, Duper Sessions was released. The jazz album was recorded in the fall of 2005 with his band the Faces Down and pianist Erik Halvorsen at Duper Studios in Bergen. The album reached No. 21 on the Billboard Jazz Albums chart.

His February 2007 release, Phantom Punch, is a rock album with a more aggressive sound than his previous work. Lerche and the Faces Down recorded and mixed the album in Los Angeles in April and May 2006, with producer Tony Hoffer.

In September 2009, Lerche released Heartbeat Radio, to critical acclaim. While it maintained the studio polish of his groundbreaking debut, there was also a sense of musical adventure that mixed acoustic guitars with grand gestures of orchestral pop, elements of 1950s Jazz, 1960s and 1970s Brazilian psych-folk, and state-of-the-art 1980s pop masters such as Prefab Sprout, Scritti Politti and Fleetwood Mac. In his review, Mikael Wood of the Los Angeles Times wrote, "No matter what genre he's working in – fuzzy garage rock, breezy vocal jazz, acoustic folk-pop – this young Norwegian singer-songwriter crafts catchier choruses than many musicians who’ve been working twice as long as he has." Allmusic Guide's Tim Sendra called Heartbeat Radio Sondre's "best work to date."

In June 2011, Lerche released the self-titled Sondre Lerche, on his own Mona Records. Praised by Rolling Stone, The New York Times, Stereogum, Filter, Spin, and Entertainment Weekly among others for its experimentation with contrasting musical sounds, this eponymous album contains Lerche's most interesting arrangements and catchy songwriting to date, but also some of his most somber and introspective. In the studio, Lerche wanted to explore his new creative alliances in Williamsburg, the Brooklyn neighborhood where he's lived on and off for the previous six years. The album was recorded – live in the studio – and mixed in a short but intense time period of three weeks. The sessions included fellow musicians – Midlake drummer McKenzie Smith, longtime producer/collaborator Kato Ådland, Dave Heilman (drummer for Regina Spektor), and co-producer, mixer, and owner of Rare Book Room Studio, Nicolas Verhnes (Spoon, Animal Collective).

Lerche celebrated his 30th birthday with the release of his first live album, Bootlegs, in 2012.

Lerche wrote and recorded Please following his divorce from Mona Fastvold. The album, known as his "divorce record", was released on 23 September 2014 on Mona Records. "Bad Law" was released as the main single for the album in June 2014.

On 3 March 2017, Lerche released his eighth studio album, Pleasure, on the PLZ label. On 24 November that year the songs from Pleasure were also released in a stripped down solo version titled Solo Pleasure. Solo Pleasure was released digitally on 14 February 2018.

In April 2022, Lerche released a double album, Avatars of Love.

Personal life
In 2005, Lerche married director and actress Mona Fastvold. They divorced in 2013. Lerche was in a relationship with writer and blogger Linnéa Myhre from 2013 to 2020.

Lerche returned to Norway in 2020. Prior to that, he lived in Los Angeles and Brooklyn, New York, where he resided from 2005 to 2018.

Sondre Lerche is the cousin of Norwegian rapper Lars Vaular. In 2012, they collaborated on the single "Øynene Lukket".

Lerche discovered a talent and joy for running in 2015 and has since completed marathons in New York, London, Berlin and Norway. His personal best time is 2:55:51 in 2020.

Discography

Albums
 Faces Down, September 2001 (October 2002 U.S.)
 Two Way Monologue, March 2004
 Duper Sessions, February 2006
 Phantom Punch, February 2007
 Dan in Real Life, October 2007 (soundtrack)
 Heartbeat Radio, September 2009
 Sondre Lerche, June 2011
 Bootlegs, September 2012 (live album)
 Please, September 2014
 Pleasure, March 2017
 Solo Pleasure, November 2017 (physical) and February 2018 (digital)
 Patience, June 2020 [Deluxe edition released October 2020]
 Avatars of Love, April 2022

Appears on
 "Dear Laughing Doubters" from the soundtrack for the motion picture Dinner for Schmucks, July 2010
 "Mr. Bassman" on the album Muppets: The Green Album, August 2011

EPs
 You Know So Well (2001) (Norway)
 No One's Gonna Come (2001) (Norway)
 Sleep on Needles (2001) (Norway, 2002 France, Spain and the United Kingdom)
 Dead Passengers (2002) (UK)
 Don't Be Shallow (2003) (USA)
 Two Way Monologue (2005) (United Kingdom)
  Daytrotter Session  (2007)
 Polaroid Pool Party (2008)
 Polaroid Pumpkin Party (2008)
 Daytrotter Sessions (2011)

Singles
 "You Know So Well" (2001)
 "No One's Gonna Come" (2001)
 "All Luck Ran Out" (2001)
 "Sleep on Needles" (2001/2002)
 "Dead Passengers" (2002)
 "Don't Be Shallow" (2003)
 "Two Way Monologue" (2004)
 "Days That Are Over" (2004)
 "Minor Detail" (2006)
 "Phantom Punch" (2006)
 "Say it All" (2006)
 "The Tape" (2007)
 "Heartbeat Radio" (2009)
 "Private Caller" (2011)
 "Domino" (2011)
 "It's Never Meant to Be"/"Countdown" (2012)
 "The Plague" (2013)
 "Public Hi-Fi Sessions 01" (2013)
 "Bad Law" (2014)
 "Despite The Night" (2015)
 "I'm Always Watching You" (2016)
 "Into You" (2016)
"Soft Feelings" (2017)
Violent Game" (2017)
"I Know Something That's Gonna Break Your Heart" (2017)
"Serenading in the Trenches" (2017)
Violent Game (Ice Choir Remix)" (2017)
"Reminisce (Radio Edit)" (2017)
Siamese Twin (Solo)" (2017)
"Bad Lier" (2017)
"I Know Somethings That's Gonna Break Your Heart (Solo)" (2017
"Surviving Christmas" (2018)
"Thank u, Next" (2018)
Slip Into Character" (2018)
"Britney" (2019)
"You Are Not Who I Thought I Was" (2020)
"Why Would I Let You Go" (2020)
That's All There Is" (2020)
 "I Could Not Love You Enough" (2020)

Awards
Newcomer Spellemannprisen (2001)

References

External links

Official website
Tiny Desk concert for NPR

1982 births
Living people
Norwegian male guitarists
Norwegian multi-instrumentalists
Norwegian singer-songwriters
People educated at Langhaugen Upper Secondary School
Spellemannprisen winners
Astralwerks artists
20th-century guitarists
21st-century Norwegian guitarists
20th-century Norwegian male singers
20th-century Norwegian singers
21st-century Norwegian male singers
21st-century Norwegian singers
Grönland Records artists
EMI Group artists